Kleopas Giannou (born 4 May 1982) is a Greek former professional footballer who played as a goalkeeper.

Club career
A graduate of the Athenian club's youth system, Giannou was loaned to Olympiakos Volou in summer 2000 until the end of the year, and spent the rest the campaign at Halkidona FC. Promoted to the senior Olympiacos squad on his return, he made his top-flight debut on 4 January 2002, but was mainly a reserve. However, although by the start of 2003/04 he was still fourth-choice, a combination of Theofanis Katergiannakis's injury, Dimitrios Eleftheropoulos's departure and Juraj Bucek's loss of form saw Giannou promoted to play in the final 12 games of the league season.

Olympiacos, however, were pipped to the title by Panathinaikos FC. The arrival of Antonios Nikopolidis from Panathinaikos relegated Giannou back to the bench. He played in just one league match, when Nikopolidis was suspended, and three Greek Cup encounters as his club completed the domestic double. In 2005/06, understudy to Nikopolidis, he played in one league encounter and made his UEFA Champions League debut against Olympique Lyonnais.

He won approximately €1m in the Greek national lottery in 2002.

On 29 August 2007 Olympiacos decided to release Giannou from his contract after he refused to be loaned out again. He spent time on trial at Championship side Cardiff City but failed to earn a full contract. From August 2007 to January 2008 he was playing for AEL FC in Cyprus and since then he is currently playing in Panionios.

International career
An Under-21 international, he was part of the Greek squad in the 2004 Olympic Games.

Honours

Club
Olympiacos
Greek Championship:  1999–2000, 2000–2001, 2001–2002, 2002–2003, 2004–2005, 2005–2006
Greek Cup: 2004–2005, 2005–2006

References

1982 births
Living people
Association football goalkeepers
Footballers at the 2004 Summer Olympics
Olympiacos F.C. players
Olympic footballers of Greece
AEL Limassol players
Panionios F.C. players
Atromitos F.C. players
Lottery winners
Expatriate footballers in Cyprus
Super League Greece players
Cypriot First Division players
A.O. Nea Ionia F.C. players
Footballers from Athens
Greek footballers